is a passenger railway station located in the city of Hino, Tokyo, Japan, operated by the private railway company, Keio Corporation.

Lines 
Mogusanen Station is served by the Keio Line, and is located 28.0 kilometers from the starting point of the line at Shinjuku Station.

Station layout 
This station consists of two opposed ground-level side platforms serving two tracks,  with the station building located above and at a right angle to the tracks and platforms.

Platforms

History
It was renamed to its present name on May 1, 1937. A new station building was completed in 2007.

Passenger statistics
In fiscal 2019, the station was used by an average of 7,620 passengers daily. 

The passenger figures for previous years are as shown below.

Surrounding area
 Mogusaen
 Hino City Mogusa Library
 Mogusaen Station Post Office

See also
 List of railway stations in Japan

References

External links

Keio Railway Station Information 

Keio Line
Stations of Keio Corporation
Railway stations in Tokyo
Railway stations in Japan opened in 1925
Hino, Tokyo